Bulgari is an Italian luxury brand.

Bulgari may also refer to:

People
Bulgari (surname), including a list of people with the surname
BULGARI, a pseudonym for Bulgarian musician Bogdan Irkük

Places
Bulgari, a village in the Romanian commune of Sălățig

Other uses
Bulgari (tribe), a Turkic people of the 7th century
Bulgari (instrument), a Turkish string instrument
Bulgari Hotel and Residences, a luxury hotel in London

See also

Voulgaris (surname), a Greek surname
Bulgar (disambiguation)
Bulgaria (disambiguation)